Princess Urraca of Bourbon-Two Sicilies (July 14, 1913, Nymphenburg Palace, Munich, Kingdom of Bavaria – May 3, 1999, Sigmaringen, Baden-Württemberg, Germany) was a member of the House of Bourbon-Two Sicilies and a Princess of Bourbon-Two Sicilies.

Early life and family

Princess Urraca of Bourbon-Two Sicilies was born on July 14, 1913 at Nymphenburg Palace in Munich, Kingdom of Bavaria. She was the sixth and youngest child of Prince Ferdinand Pius of Bourbon-Two Sicilies, Duke of Calabria (1869–1960) and his wife Princess Maria Ludwiga Theresia of Bavaria (1872–1954). Ferdinand Pius was the Head of the House of Bourbon-Two Sicilies and pretender to the defunct throne of the Kingdom of the Two Sicilies from May 26, 1934 to January 7, 1960. Urraca had five older siblings, four sisters and one brother: Princess Maria Antonietta (1898–1957), Princess Maria Cristina (1899–1985), Prince Ruggiero Maria, Duke of Noto (1901–1914), Princess Barbara Maria (1902–1927), and Princess Lucia (1908–2001).

Through her father, Urraca was a granddaughter of Prince Alfonso of Bourbon-Two Sicilies, Count of Caserta (1841–1934) and his wife Princess Maria Antonietta of Bourbon-Two Sicilies (1851–1938). Urraca was descended from Francis I, King of the Two Sicilies (1777–1830) through her paternal great-grandfathers, Ferdinand II, King of the Two Sicilies (1810–1859) and Prince Francis of Bourbon-Two Sicilies, Count of Trapani (1827–1892). Through her mother, she was a granddaughter of Ludwig III, King of Bavaria (1845– 1921) and his wife Archduchess Maria Theresa of Austria-Este (1849–1919).

Urraca chose not to celebrate her birthday, stating: "How can a Bourbon celebrate on the day of the Bastille's taking?"

Adult life
As the daughter of the heir-apparent, then head of the House of Bourbon-Two Sicilies, Urraca regularly represented her family at royal and aristocratic functions and charitable events. She attended the funeral of her great uncle Prince Leopold of Bavaria on October 3, 1930 at St. Michael's Church in Munich. Urraca, her mother, and her sister Lucia attended an afternoon dance tea at the Hotel Vier Jahreszeiten and the Hungarian Aid Association's Hungarian Ball in Munich in January 1934. She also took part in the closing events of Munich's Carnival celebrations in February 1936. On April 16, 1936, Urraca attended the wedding of her first cousin Infante Alfonso of Spain, Prince of Bourbon-Two Sicilies to Princess Alicia of Bourbon-Parma at the Minoritenkirche in Vienna. She was a guest of honor at the Austrian Armed Forces' Spring Parade in April 1936, along with Alfonso XIII of Spain, Princess Maria Anna of Bourbon-Parma, and Prince Elias of Bourbon-Parma. Urraca attended the Baltic Red Cross Ball and the ball of Countess Adelheid Arco-Valley in the Cherubinsälen of the Hotel Vier Jahreszeiten in February 1938. On October 23, 1957, she attended the wedding of her first cousin  Princess Marie Gabrielle of Bavaria and Georg, Prince of Waldburg zu Zeil und Trauchburg in Munich.

On the night of January 10, 1957, Urraca was driving her eldest sister Maria Antonietta to her home in Lindau, Germany when their automobile collided with a truck that had skid on ice near Winterthur, Switzerland. Maria Antonietta was killed in the accident and Urraca was seriously injured.

Urraca was also an active supporter of Duosicilian historical societies and other royalty and nobility organizations. In October 1993, she attended a conference of over 200 Italian nobles and aristocrats at the Palazzo Pallavicini-Rospigliosi in Rome, which advocated for the nobility's renewed leadership in the defense of Catholic principles in political and cultural institutions. Her first cousin once removed and claimant to the Duosicilian throne, Infante Carlos, Duke of Calabria, was also in attendance. In February 1994, Urraca traveled to Gaeta where she participated in a tribute to the centenary of the death of Francis II, King of the Two Sicilies and an observation of the 133rd anniversary of the conclusion of the Siege of Gaeta which marked the victory of the Kingdom of Sardinia over Two Sicilies.

Death, interment and legacy 

Urraca died on May 3, 1999 in Sigmaringen, Baden-Württemberg, Germany.

Titles, styles, honours and arms

Titles and styles
 July 14, 1913 – May 3, 1999: Her Royal Highness Princess Urraca of Bourbon-Two Sicilies

Honours
 Dame Grand Cross of Justice of the Sacred Military Constantinian Order of Saint George
 Dame of Honor and Devotion of the Sovereign Military Order of Malta

Ancestry

References 

1913 births
1999 deaths
Burials at the Church of Saints Peter and Paul (Rieden, Swabia)
Dames of Malta
Nobility from Munich
People from Sigmaringen
People from the Kingdom of Bavaria
Princesses of Bourbon-Two Sicilies